Sipilou (also known as Siquita) is a town in the far west of Ivory Coast. It is a sub-prefecture of and seat of Sipilou Department in Tonkpi Region, Montagnes District. Sipilou is also a commune. Less than three kilometres to the west of the town is a border crossing with Guinea.

In 2014, the population of the sub-prefecture of Sipilou was 22,417.

Villages
The 8 villages of the sub-prefecture of Sipilou and their population in 2014 are:
 Bloma (1 254)
 Séma (1 495)
 Sipilou (5 705)
 Gaba (1 393)
 Glangoualé (1 289)
 Glanlé (5 077)
 Koulalé (3 654)
 Yallo (2 550)

Notes

Sub-prefectures of Tonkpi
Guinea–Ivory Coast border crossings
Communes of Tonkpi